This is a list of films which placed number-one at the weekend box office in Colombia during 2019. Amounts are in American dollars.

References

2019 in Colombia
2019
Colombia